Qalaat al-Madiq Subdistrict  is a Syrian nahiyah (subdistrict) located in al-Suqaylabiyah District in Hama.  According to the Syria Central Bureau of Statistics (CBS), Qalaat al-Madiq Subdistrict had a population of 85,597 in the 2004 census.

References 

Qalaat al-Madiq
Al-Suqaylabiyah District